Jeremiah Connors   was an outfielder in Major League Baseball. He played one game for the Philadelphia Phillies in 1892.

References

External links

Major League Baseball outfielders
Philadelphia Phillies players
19th-century baseball players
Baseball players from Cleveland